"Set Adrift on Memory Bliss" is a song by American hip-hop group P.M. Dawn, released in August 1991 as the second single from their debut album, Of the Heart, of the Soul and of the Cross: The Utopian Experience (1991). It is built around samples of Spandau Ballet's "True", the Soul Searchers' "Ashley's Roachclip", and the Bob James version of Paul Simon's "Take Me to the Mardi Gras", with the remainder of the song written by P.M. Dawn vocalist Attrell "Prince Be" Cordes. Only Prince Be and "True" writer Gary Kemp were credited for writing the track.

The song was P.M. Dawn's first and only number-one hit on the US Billboard Hot 100, and it was the first number-one song after the debut of the Nielsen SoundScan system, which monitored airplay and sales more closely than before, when Billboard had to rely on manual sales reports and airplay data. According to the test charts of the SoundScan system, "Set Adrift on Memory Bliss" was at number one for at least three weeks but officially has a one-week reign at number one. Worldwide, it reached number one in New Zealand, number three in the United Kingdom and number seven in Australia. It was ranked number 81 on VH1's "100 Greatest Songs of Hip Hop". And Blender ranked it at number 94 in their list of "Greatest Songs Since You Were Born" in 2005.

Critical reception
In an retrospective review, Justin Chadwick from Albumism called the song "unforgettable" and "pure pop perfection". He added, "Regardless of where you ultimately netted out with respect to your overall opinion of P.M. Dawn, if you're like me, you were hooked the first time you heard the pop-infused brilliance of "Set Adrift on Memory Bliss"." Steve Huey from AllMusic described it as a "shimmering" ballad. Another editor, Hal Horowitz, said it's an "amazingly mature debut tune". Upon the release, J.D. Considine from The Baltimore Sun felt that "they create entirely new grooves out of half-remembered song-bites, like the slice of Spandau Ballet's "True" that crops up in "Set Adrift on Memory Bliss". A pleasant surprise." Dave Sholin from the Gavin Report wrote, "Hypnotic rap from New Jersey brothers Prince Be and DJ Minutemix [...] not only brings back a memory or two, it's sure to create new ones. It has fresh production elements and a chorus with all the relaxing, calming qualities of a nice long massage. A massive hit overseas, it's set to become just as big in North America thanks to early airplay at key crossover outlets." 

Alan Jones of Music Week named it Single of the Week, commenting, "A brilliant soundscape starts with some nice vocal work, followed by the drum track from Dennis Edwards' "Don't Look Any Further" before Spandau Ballet's "True" leads into a mellow rap. A serene summer smash." A reviewer from Newcastle Evening Chronicle described it as a "dreamy rap song". Johnny Dee from Smash Hits named it Single of the Fortnight, calling it the "dreamiest, most laid-back record ever invented." He added, "Quite what lyrics like "rubber bands expand in a frustrating sigh" mean is a total mystery, but if ever a record could be described as — aherm — like being massaged by a bag of marshmallows, then this is it. Melt city!" While reviewing Of the Heart, of the Soul and of the Cross: The Utopian Experience, the magazine's Gary Kipper stated that the song "is, of course, one of the most summery records ever made". Jonathan Bernstein from Spin wrote, "The hit track, the play track, the ultimate "Huh?" inducer, "Set Adrift on Memory Bliss" is a classic of languid lassitude. Deadpan as De La doing "West End Girls", "Memory" opens with a laconically drawled "The camera pans the cocktail glass behind a blind of plastic plants" and just gets better from there."

Impact and legacy
"Set Adrift on Memory Bliss" was ranked number 81 on VH1's "100 Greatest Songs of Hip Hop". In 2005, Blender ranked it at number 94 in their list of "Greatest Songs Since You Were Born". In 2020, Cleveland.com listed the song at number 27 in their ranking of the best Billboard Hot 100 No. 1 song of the 1990s, calling it "one of the most unlikely No. 1 hits on this list and maybe the most complex." They added, "Somehow it all amounts to four minutes of hip hop, well, bliss."

Music video
The accompanying music video for the song premiered in August 1991 and was directed by American film director Mark Pellington. Spandau Ballet lead singer Tony Hadley appears toward the end of the video.

Track listings

 7-inch single
 "Set Adrift on Memory Bliss" (radio mix) – 3:57
 "For the Love of Peace" – 3:29

 12-inch single
A1. "Set Adrift on Memory Bliss" (extended mix) – 6:04
A2. "Set Adrift on Memory Bliss" (radio mix) – 3:57
B1. "A Watcher's Point of View (Don't 'Cha Think)" (Youth extended mix) – 6:05
B2. "A Watcher's Point of View (Don't 'Cha Think)" (Youth radio mix) – 3:58

 CD maxi
 "Set Adrift on Memory Bliss" (radio mix) – 3:58
 "Set Adrift on Memory Bliss" (extended mix) – 6:03
 "Set Adrift on Memory Bliss" (LP version) – 4:12
 "For the Love of Peace" – 3:29

Charts and sales

Weekly charts

Year-end charts

Certifications

Release history

See also
 List of Hot 100 number-one singles of 1991 (U.S.)

References

1990s ballads
1991 singles
1991 songs
1992 singles
Billboard Hot 100 number-one singles
Island Records singles
Music videos directed by Mark Pellington
Music Week number-one dance singles
Number-one singles in New Zealand
P.M. Dawn songs
Songs written by Attrell Cordes
Songs written by Gary Kemp